John Daniel Pierce (born January 17, 1948) is a former American football running back in the National Football League for the Washington Redskins. He played college football at the University of Memphis and Mississippi State University and was drafted in the fifth round of the 1970 NFL Draft.

Pierce appeared in two games during the 1970 NFL season, carrying five times for six yards and catching one pass for six yards.

Pierce was a quarterback for Memphis State.

References

1948 births
Living people
People from Laurel, Mississippi
American football running backs
Memphis Tigers football players
Mississippi State Bulldogs football players
Pearl River Wildcats football players
Washington Redskins players
Players of American football from Mississippi